House on the Waterfront (French: Port du désir) is a 1955 French drama film directed by  Edmond T. Gréville and starring  Jean Gabin, Andrée Debar and Henri Vidal.

It was made at the Billancourt Studios with some location filming in Marseilles. The film's sets were designed by Lucien Aguettand. Although completed in 1954, it wasn't released until the following year.

Synopsis
In Marseilles Captain Lequévic is ordered to refloat a ship that has sunk in the entrance to the harbor. However its owner, a man mixed up in smuggling and other illegal activities, is desperate to prevent him from doing so.

Partial cast
 Jean Gabin  as Le commandant Lequévic  
 Andrée Debar  as Martine  
 Henri Vidal as Michel  
 Edith Georges  as Lola  
 Leopoldo Francés as Baba  
 René Sarvil  as L'aveugle  
 Gaby Basset  as Madame Aimée  
 Jacques Dynam as Le Meur  
 Gaston Orbal  as Rossignol 
 Edmond Ardisson as Le patron de la boîte  
 Mireille Ozy  as Gaby  
 Annette Maistre  as Une entraîneuse  
 Yôko Tani as Une entraîneuse  
 Raymond Blot  
 Robert Berri as Frédo, le malfrat  
 Antonin Berval as Léon  
 Jean-Roger Caussimon  as Monsieur Black

References

Bibliography 
 Marcelline Block. World Film Locations: Marseilles. Intellect Books, 2013.

External links 
 

1955 films
French drama films
1955 drama films
1950s French-language films
Films directed by Edmond T. Gréville
Films set in Marseille
Films shot at Billancourt Studios
Seafaring films
Films scored by Joseph Kosma
French black-and-white films
1950s French films